The 1990–91 I liga (then known as the 1990–91 II liga) was the 43rd season of the I liga, the second highest division in the Polish football league system since its establishment in 1949. The league was operated by the Polish Football Association (PZPN). 20 teams took part in them, playing in a circular system. The league season began in July 1990, the last matches were played in June 1991. It was the last edition of the I liga before the competition reform, after which two groups of this level were restored.

Stal Stalowa Wola won the championship for the first time in their history.

Participating teams 
The order of the teams according to the place taken at the end of the season.
 Stal Stalowa Wola – I liga champion, promoted to Ekstraklasa
 Widzew Łódź  – I liga runner-up, promoted to Ekstraklasa
 Jagiellonia Białystok – promoted to Ekstraklasa play-offs
 Miedź Legnica
 Stilon Gorzów Wielkopolski
 Raków Częstochowa
 Polonia Bytom
 Siarka Tarnobrzeg
 Szombierki Bytom
 Górnik Wałbrzych
 Pogoń Szczecin
 Lechia Gdańsk
 Resovia
 Odra Wodzisław Śląski
 Stal Rzeszów
 Zagłębie Wałbrzych
 Korona Kielce
 Gwardia Warsaw
 Hutnik Warsaw – relegated to II liga
 Ostrovia Ostrów Wielkopolski – relegated to II liga

Top goalscorers

References

1990–91 in Polish football
Pol
I liga seasons